I Wish That I Had Duck Feet is a children's book written by Dr. Seuss, illustrated by B. Tobey, and first published in 1965. "Theo. LeSieg" was a pen name of Theodor Geisel, who is more commonly known as Dr. Seuss. The story is about a boy who wishes that he could have many different animal and mechanical body parts. For each body part, he finds fantastic uses for them, as well as their problematic aspects. At the end, he decides that he is happiest being himself.

1965 children's books
American picture books
Books by Dr. Seuss
Random House books